Cuca is a Mexican alternative metal band from Guadalajara, Jalisco that was formed in 1989 by musician and painter José Fors (vocals). Their first official concert, according to the band, was on February 14, 1990. Their first record, La Invasión de los Blátidos (1992), set them apart from any other Mexican band, since the album contained irreverent, humorous, curse-word laden lyrics and an aggressive sound that, at the time, was not expected in Mexican music. "Cuca" is an apocope for cucaracha (cockroach), and blátidos means blattodea, which is the scientific name given to cockroaches. 

In 1999, the band split up for unspecified reasons. In March 2004, they reunited for a series of concerts in la Concha Acústica del Parque Agua Azul of Guadalajara which were edited into the DVD titled Viva Cuca.

Members
  José Alberto Fors Ferro – Vocals
 Jesús Ignacio González Sevilla – Drums
 Óscar Galileo Ochoa Soto – Guitar
 Carlos Gilberto Avilez Ortega – Bass

Other Members
 Alfonso Fors Ferro – Vocals

Discography

Studio albums 
 La Invasión de los Blátidos (1992)
 Tu Cuca Madre Ataca de Nuevo (1993)
 La Racha (1995)
 El Cuarto de Cuca (1997)
 Con Pelotas (2006)
 La Venganza de Cucamonga (2015)
 Semen (2017)
 Pornoblattea (2020)

Live albums 
 2004: Viva Cuca

DVDs 
 2005: Viva Cuca DVD

Compilations 
Silencio=Muerte: Red Hot + Latin (1996)
 Rock Millenium (1999)
 La Buena Racha (1999)
 Rock en Español: Lo Mejor de Cuca (2001)
 Este es tu Rock: Cuca (2006)

Singles

External links
Short report about Cuca's reunion
Online interview with the band, reminiscing their first concerts and various questions

Musical groups from Guadalajara, Jalisco
Mexican rock music groups
Rock en Español music groups
Musical groups established in 1990